The Moderate Republicans were a faction of American politicians within the Republican Party from the party founding from before the American Civil War in 1854 until the end of Reconstruction in the Compromise of 1877. They were known for their loyal support of President Abraham Lincoln's war policies and expressed antipathy towards the more militant stances advocated by the Radical Republicans. According to historian Eric Foner, congressional leaders of the faction were James G. Blaine, John A. Bingham, William P. Fessenden, Lyman Trumbull, and John Sherman. Their constituencies were primarily residents of states outside New England, where Radical Republicanism garnered insufficient support. They included "Conservative Republicans" and the moderate Liberal Republicans, later also known as "Half-Breeds".

During the 1864 United States presidential election, amidst the backdrop of the ongoing Civil War, Moderate Republicans supported merging the Republican Party with the War Democrats (Democrats who supported the continuation of the Union war effort) to form the National Union Party alliance. At the Republican National Convention (which operated under the name of the "National Union National Convention" that year), they spearheaded the effort to replace Lincoln's vice president Hannibal Hamlin with Tennessee Democrat Andrew Johnson, acting out of the belief that placing a War Democrat on the presidential ticket would solidify support to ensure Lincoln's re-election.

In contrast to Radicals, Moderate Republicans were less enthusiastic on the issue of black suffrage even while embracing civil equality and the expansive federal authority observed throughout the American Civil War. They were also skeptical of the lenient, conciliatory Reconstruction policies of President Andrew Johnson. Members of the Moderate Republicans comprised in part of previous Radical Republicans who became disenchanted with the alleged corruption of the latter faction. Charles Sumner, a Massachusetts senator who led Radical Republicans in the 1860s, later joined reform-minded moderates as he later opposed the corruption associated with the Grant administration.

See also
Conservative Republicans (Reconstruction era)

References

Factions in the Republican Party (United States)
Moderate Republicans (Reconstruction era)